Gökçekent is a village of Ermenek of Karaman Province of Turkey. The village's old name is Akmanastır.  Gökçekent means 'nice'.

There is a historical monastery just west of the village from the Byzantine Empire.

Villages in Ermenek District